The Catholic Church in Austria is part of the worldwide Catholic Church in full communion with the Pope in Rome. The Church's governing body in Austria is the Austrian Conference of Catholic Bishops, made up of the hierarchy of the two archbishops (Vienna and Salzburg), the bishops and the abbot of territorial abbey of Wettingen-Mehrerau. Nevertheless, each bishop is independent in his own diocese, answerable only to the Pope. The current president of the Conference of Catholic Bishops is Cardinal Christoph Schönborn. The Austrian church is the largest Christian Confession of Austria, with 4.73 million members (52.0 % of the total Austrian population) in 2022.

For more than 50 years, however, the proportion of Catholics has decreased, primarily due to secularization and migration (from 89% in 1961 to 52% in 2022). The number of Sunday churchgoers in 2021 was around 3.1 percent (as percentage of the total Austrian population that is 281,131 churchgoers out of a total population of 8,978,929).

Although Austria has no primate, the archbishop of Salzburg is titled Primus Germaniae (Primate of Germany).

Organisation

Ecclesiastical structure

Archdiocese of Vienna with the following suffragan dioceses:
Diocese of Eisenstadt
Diocese of Linz
Diocese of St. Pölten
Archdiocese of Salzburg with the following suffragans
Diocese of Graz-Seckau
Diocese of Gurk
Diocese of Feldkirch
Diocese of Innsbruck
Territorial Abbey of Wettingen-Mehrerau (immediately subject to the Holy See)
Military Ordinariate of Austria (immediately subject to the Holy See)

List of Catholic organisations in Austria
Katholische Jungschar
Katholische Jugend

Statistics
71% of Austrian Catholics support same-sex marriage and 26% oppose it.

Criticism

Call to Disobedience organization

The organization Call to Disobedience (Aufruf zum Ungehorsam in German) is an Austrian movement mainly composed of dissident Catholic priests which started in 2006. The movement claims the support of the majority of Austrian Catholic priests and favors ordination of women, married and non-celibate priesthood, allowing Holy Communion to remarried divorcees and non-Catholics which disagrees with teachings of the Catholic Magisterium. The group also believes the way the Church is governed needs reform.

Notable people
Mozart
Emerich Coreth
Leopold III, Margrave of Austria
Heinrich Maier, important resistance fighter against Nazi terror
Gregor Mendel
Zacharias Traber
Franz Wasner

See also
Apostolic Nuncio to Austria
Catholic Church by country

References

External links
Catholic Church in Austria